Hesperaptyxis is a genus of sea snails, marine gastropod mollusks in the subfamily Fusininae  of the family Fasciolariidae, the spindle snails and tulip snails.

Species
 Hesperaptyxis ambustus (Gould, 1853)
 Hesperaptyxis cinereus (Reeve, 1847)
 Hesperaptyxis felipensis (H. N. Lowe, 1935)
 Hesperaptyxis fredbakeri (H. N. Lowe, 1935)
 Hesperaptyxis luteopictus (Dall, 1877)
 † Hesperaptyxis meridionalis Callomon & Snyder, 2017 
 Hesperaptyxis negusi Snyder & Vermeij, 2016

References

External links
 Snyder M.A. & Vermeij G.J. (2016). Hesperaptyxis, a new genus for some western American Fasciolariidae (Gastropoda), with the description of a new species. The Nautilus. 130(3): 122-126